Shri Purohit Swami ( – 1941) was a Hindu teacher from Maharashtra, India.

Purohit was born in Badnera, Vidarbha, India to a wealthy Maharashtran Brahmin family. His parents gave him the name Shankar Gajannan Purohit.

As a child he became proficient in Marathi, English, and Sanskrit. He was well educated, obtaining a B.A. in philosophy at Calcutta University in 1903 and a law degree from Deccan College and Bombay University.

As a teenager, he decided to be celibate (as a Brahmacharya), but in 1908 he accommodated his parents' wishes and married Godu Bai. After the birth of daughters in 1910 and 1914 and a son in 1915, he resumed his vow of celibacy.

A year or two before his marriage, he met a young man only four years older than himself named Natekar. Purohit says this meeting "was love at first sight," and Natekar, who later took the monastic name Bhagwan Shri Hamsa, became Purohit's guru.

In 1923 his guru directed him to embark on a mendicant pilgrimage the length and breadth of India. Begging bowl in hand, he passed several years in this way. He travelled to Europe on an extended visit in 1930.

Purohit is known in the West principally for his work on translations of major Hindu texts, and his  The Autobiography of an Indian Monk: His Life And His Adventures (1932) written with an accompanying introduction by the Irish poet William Butler Yeats, who has befriended and collaborated with him from then on, until Yeats's death . Subsequently, in 1934 he was mentioned in Bhagwan Shri Hamsa's book The Holy Mountain, supplemented with an introduction by Yeats. He   worked with W. B. Yeats during 1935 and 1936, in Majorca, on the translations to The Ten Principal Upanishads (1938, Faber and Faber). Another book, which have been written as a result of the joint collaboration between W.B Yeats and Shri Purohit Swami, is the Swami's own version to Patanjali's Aphorisms of Yoga, published also in 1938, with a handful of illustrated Yoga exercises and postures, as an appendix to the theoretical and spiritual principles of Yoga teachings, which by convention, constitute the majority of the book pages. Yeats included him as a respectful gesture, in the Oxford Book of Modern Verse 1892–1935.
He translated the Bhagavad Gita into English, and this translation can be viewed here. Unlike most translations, Shri Purohit Swami's translates every word into English and avoids the use of Sanskrit concepts that may be unfamiliar to English-speakers, for example translating the word 'yoga' as 'spirituality'. He also avoids mentioning the Caste system; where the original Gita mentions the different castes he interprets this as different occupations within society.

He represents a very important but largely unremembered link between the generation of Swami Vivekananda and the Post World War II society in which eastern thought has become an accepted element of spiritual life.

Writers from Maharashtra
20th-century Hindu religious leaders
1882 births
1941 deaths
People from Amravati district
University of Calcutta alumni